Kochelsee or Lake Kochel is a lake  south of Munich on the edge of the Bavarian Alps. The western 1.7 km² or 28.3 percent of the lake lies within the borders of the town of Schlehdorf, while the rest belongs to Kochel am See. The southern edge of the lake lies up against the mountains and the northern shore is bordered by bog lands. The history of the settlement of Kochel (previously Quochcalun) begins with Birg bei Altjoch, a rock extrusion on the shore of the lake. The name Kochel is derived from the Latin cocula meaning head or cone.

The Loisach flows into the lake at Schlehdorf and flows out at Kochel am See. A similar amount of water flows into the lake from the Isar through the Lake Walchen Power Plant.

Origin
The lake was created during the last glacial period of the current ice age by the Loisach-Isar glacier. The bottom of the glacier scraped out the lakebed. The basin then filled with water at the end of the glacial period. The northern end of the lake silted up forming bogs.

Settlements
The following settlements border the lake:
 Kochel am See
 Raut (part of Schlehdorf)
 Schlehdorf
 Altjoch (part of Kochel am See)

All are part of the district Bad Tölz-Wolfratshausen.

See also

 Stein, a mountain overlooking the lake near Kochel am See

List of lakes in Bavaria

External links

 

Lakes of Bavaria
LKochelsee 
Bad Tölz-Wolfratshausen
Upper Bavaria
Glacial lakes